The 2001 Bandy World Championship for men was played in Haparanda, Sweden, and Oulu, Finland, on March 24–April 1, 2001. The main arena was Raksila Artificial Ice Rink Pakkalan kenttä. Russia became champions.

Group stage

Final four

References
bandysidan.nu

2001
Bandy World Championship
Bandy World Championship
World Championship
International bandy competitions hosted by Sweden
International bandy competitions hosted by Finland
Bandy World Championship
Bandy World Championship